Mirmiran the military title of the Ottoman Pasha, similar to the title of Beylerbey, the ruler of Eyalet. Initially, the title was assigned to two pashas: the ruler of Kyustendil—Mirmiran Rumelia; to the ruler of Erzurum—Mirmiran of Anatolia; however, then the number of title holders increased to 20. The "mir-mir-an" itself means "commandant over commandants".

See also
 Battle of Velbazhd
 History of Kyustendil

Notes

Military history of the Ottoman Empire
Military ranks
Ottoman titles